Awye could be one of two Papuan languages of Indonesia:
Awyi language, near the Papua New Guinea border
Auye language, south of Cenderawasih Bay